Vayoel Moshe is a Hebrew book written by Rabbi Joel Teitelbaum, founder of the Satmar Hasidic movement, in 1961. In it, Teitelbaum argues that Zionism is incompatible with Judaism.

As Teitelbaum explains in the introduction, the book's title is taken from the biblical verse of Exodus 2:21, and hints to Teitelbaum's first name (Yoel), and to his grandfather, Moshe Teitelbaum. The verse, which states, "And Moses agreed to stay ... an alien in a foreign land", hints to Teitelbaum's conclusion that the Jewish people should remain in exile.

The book is considered to be Teitelbaum's magnum opus, and is of the utmost importance to Satmar Hasidim, as well as to other Haredim who follow the Satmar doctrine regarding Zionism. Satmar Hasidism has many institutions, buildings, and neighborhoods named after the book.

Vayoel Moshe is primarily a book of Halacha, Jewish law. However, it draws on Rabbinic Jewish philosophy as well.

Structure
The book consists of three parts: 

1. Maamar Shalosh Shevuos (Treatise regarding the Three Oaths), is an in-depth analysis of the Three Oaths and their practical halachic implications.

The "Three Oaths" are originally detailed by the Talmud in tractate Ketubot. The Talmud discusses a passage from the Song of Songs in the Tanakh (Hebrew Bible) in which God made the Israelites promise "to wait for Him before arousing his love", as "King Solomon in Song of Songs thrice adjured the daughters of Jerusalem not to arouse or bestir the love until it is ready". The Talmud explains that the Jewish people are bound by three oaths:
 Not to ascend to Eretz Yisrael "like a wall" (i. e.,  in a strong manner).
 Not to rebel against the nations of the world. 
 Not to delay the coming of the Messiah.

The Talmud follows the discussion of the oaths with a strong warning:... Rabbi Elazar said: The Holy One, Blessed be He, said to the Jewish people: If you fulfill the oath, it is good, and if not, I will abandon your flesh, and all will devour you like the gazelles and like the hinds of the field.
Teitelbaum discusses the legal status of the oaths, and what they imply. He argues that while the oaths are clearly metaphorical, and do not have the legal status of actual oaths, they are to be understood as guidelines for what is considered to be an attempt to leave exile before divine redemption, which he posits is severely forbidden and is tantamount to heresy.<ref>Vayoel Moshe, Maamar Shalosh Shevuos, simanim 42-45</ref>

2. Maamar Yishuv Eretz Yisroel (Treatise about settling the Land of Israel), which seeks to clarify if there is a halachic obligation to dwell in the land of Israel, as well as general halachic concerns regarding Jews emigrating to Israel, known as Aliyah.

3. Maamar Leshon HaKodesh (Treatise about the holy tongue), in which Teitelbaum writes that not only is there no reason to choose to speak Modern Hebrew – it is actually forbidden. This was written as a personal answer to the chief rabbi of Montreal at the time, Rabbi Pinchas Hirschsprung, and it was later added into this book.

Other arguments
 Rabbi Teitelbaum refers to Religious Zionism as a "major desecration of God's name".
 Blames Zionism for worsening, and the aveirah of Zionism for being a cause of, the Holocaust, both in direct ways, as well as on a spiritual level, by causing the fulfillment of the slaughter the Talmud says will happen if the oaths are violated.
 Refers to Zionist leaders such as Theodor Herzl as  "heretics". 
 Argues that any participation in the Israeli elections is one of the worst sins, and halachically, a Jew must rather be killed than vote.
 Blames some of the bloodshed in the Middle East on the Zionists.
 Rules that it is forbidden to accept any money from Israeli government programs.
 Asserts that the way of the Baal Shem Tov is forgotten today, and that Hasidus is no longer properly understood.
 Argues against the practice of  making decisions on the basis of folk tales about Hasidic rabbis, especially in matters of Halacha.
 Stresses that blind faith in the righteous is foolish, as even genuinely learned and pious scholars can be misled, make errors, or abandon their righteous ways; rather, a person must conduct his own examination of the original sources.

See also
 Three Oaths
External links
Rabbi Gil Student's arguments against Vayoel Moshe, with a counter argument
 The book Vayoel Moshe (full in Hebrew)
 An English translation of Vayoel Moshe'' in progress, as well as lectures in English.
 Rav Aviner's response to Vayoel Moshe
 Shaul Magid: The Satmar Are Anti-Zionist. Should We Care?: In:

References

Books critical of Zionism
Satmar (Hasidic dynasty)
1961 non-fiction books
Hasidic literature
Hasidic anti-Zionism